Frank Alexander "Rip" Reagan (March 20, 1900 – February 22, 1971) was an American football player and coach.

Early years
Frank A. Reagan was born on March 20, 1900 in Delta, Alabama to William Eugene Reagan and Ann Judson Jenkins.

Auburn University
He was a prominent guard for the Auburn Tigers of Auburn University, captain of the 1923 team. Reagan was twice selected All-Southern.

High school coach and educator
Reagan was head coach at Gadsden City High School from 1924 to 1927. He also coached at Disque High School. Reagan was once principal of Emma Sansom High School.

Military
Reagan was also prominent in the military.

References

1900 births
1971 deaths
American football guards
Auburn Tigers football players
High school football coaches in Alabama
All-Southern college football players
People from Clay County, Alabama
Players of American football from Alabama